Václav Nový was a Bohemian track and field athlete who competed at the 1900 Summer Olympics in Paris, France. Nový competed in the 100 metres event, but was eliminated in the first round (quarterfinals) after taking third in his heat.

References

External links 

 De Wael, Herman. Herman's Full Olympians: "Athletics 1900". Accessed 18 March 2006.
 

Athletes (track and field) at the 1900 Summer Olympics
Olympic athletes of Bohemia
Year of birth missing
Year of death missing
Czech male sprinters
Place of birth missing
Place of death missing